Willie Mack is an American country music singer-songwriter born in Tulsa, Oklahoma and raised in Chico, Texas. He has had his songs recorded by Sara Evans, Collin Raye, The Oak Ridge Boys, and Mark Wills among others. His single "Don't Waste Your Pretty" charted on the Canadian Hot 100.

Biography
Mack attended Belmont University, and signed a publishing deal with Famous Music after graduating. In 2004, Mack released his first album, Average Guy. He had a hand in writing every song on the project. The first single, "We Can't All Be From Texas," reached the top 10 on the Texas Music Chart and was used by George W. Bush during his 2004 election campaign. It was also played in the stadium during the stadium of the 2004 college football game between Oklahoma Sooners and the University of Texas Longorns (the Red River Shootout.)

When Canadian artists such as George Canyon, Adam Gregory and Brad Johner began recording Mack's songs, he started making trips to Canada and writing with Canadian songwriters. One of those songwriters was Jason McCoy, who would become the co-producer of Mack's second album and the co-writer of its first single, "Gonna Get Me a Cadillac." The album, Headlights & Tailpipes, was recorded in Toronto, Nashville and Texas. It was released in July 2007 in Canada on Open Road Recordings. Once again, Mack wrote or co-wrote all twelve tracks. The album's second single, "Don't Waste Your Pretty," peaked at No. 94 on the all-genre Canadian Hot 100. Mack released his third album, The Journey, in 2009.

In 2012, Mack formed the group Friday Night Satellites.

Discography

Studio albums

Singles

Music videos

Awards and nominations

References

External links
Official Site

American country singer-songwriters
American male singer-songwriters
Belmont University alumni
Open Road Recordings artists
Musicians from Tulsa, Oklahoma
Year of birth missing (living people)
Living people
People from Wise County, Texas
Singer-songwriters from Texas
Singer-songwriters from Oklahoma
Country musicians from Texas
Country musicians from Oklahoma